Kanevka is a rural locality (a selo) in Lovozersky District of Murmansk Oblast, Russia, located beyond the Arctic Circle on the Kola Peninsula at a height of  above sea level. Population: 67 (2010 Census).

References

Notes

Sources

Rural localities in Murmansk Oblast